The 2021 season was the Philadelphia Eagles'  89th season in the National Football League and their first under head coach Nick Sirianni. They improved on their 4–11–1 record from the previous season after a 40–29 win against the New Orleans Saints in Week 11 and returned to the playoffs after a one-year absence. This was the Eagles' first season since 2015 without quarterback Carson Wentz, as he was traded to the Indianapolis Colts in March 2021.

The Eagles started the season slowly with a 2–5 record. However, things turned around and the Eagles went 7–2 in their next 9 games and clinched a playoff berth after a one-year absence. The Eagles finished tied with the New Orleans Saints for the last Wild Card spot, but won the tiebreaker based on their Week 11 head-to-head victory over the Saints. The Eagles went on to face the Tampa Bay Buccaneers in the Wild Card round, but lost by a score of 31–15 to the defending champions.

Despite the 9–8 record, the Eagles did not beat any team that made the playoffs in the 2021 season, going 0–6.

Roster changes

Free agents

Signings

Departures

Trades
March 17: The Eagles traded QB Carson Wentz to the Indianapolis Colts for a third-round pick in the 2021 NFL Draft and a conditional second-round pick in the 2022 NFL Draft.
March 17: Per the terms that saw WR Marquise Goodwin traded to the Philadelphia Eagles in 2020, Goodwin has reverted to San Francisco 49ers after not appearing for Philadelphia. The Eagles received a seventh-round selection in the 2021 NFL Draft from 49ers as part of this deal.
May 18: The Eagles traded CB Jameson Houston and a sixth-round pick in the 2023 NFL Draft to the Jacksonville Jaguars for CB Josiah Scott.
August 28: The Eagles traded a conditional sixth-round pick in the 2022 NFL Draft to the Jacksonville Jaguars for QB Gardner Minshew.
August 31: The Eagles traded G Matt Pryor and a seventh-round pick in the 2022 NFL Draft to the Indianapolis Colts for a sixth-round pick in the 2022 NFL Draft.
October 15: The Eagles traded TE Zach Ertz to the Arizona Cardinals for CB Tay Gowan and a fifth-round pick in the 2022 NFL Draft.
October 25: The Eagles traded QB Joe Flacco to the New York Jets for a conditional sixth-round pick in the 2022 NFL Draft.
 November 2: The Eagles traded a sixth-round pick in the 2022 NFL Draft to the Denver Broncos for CB Kary Vincent Jr.

Draft

Draft Notes
 The Eagles received two compensatory selections, both in the sixth round (224th and 225th overall).
 The Eagles traded a fourth-round selection (110th) to the Cleveland Browns in exchange for defensive end Genard Avery.
 The Eagles received a third-round selection (84th) and a 2022 conditional second-round selection, which became a first-round selection, from the Indianapolis Colts in exchange for quarterback Carson Wentz
 The Eagles received 2020 and 2021 fifth-round selections (156th) from the Dallas Cowboys in exchange for a 2020 fourth-round selection.
 The Eagles received 2021 seventh-round selection (240th) from the San Francisco 49ers as part of the deal that saw Marquise Goodwin revert to the 49ers.
 The Eagles traded their first-round selection (6th) and a fifth-round selection (156th) to the Miami Dolphins in exchange for a first-round selection (12th), a fourth-round selection (123rd), and a 2022 first-round selection.
The Eagles traded their first-round selection (12th) and third-round selection (84th) to the Dallas Cowboys in exchange for a first round selection (10th)
Philadelphia traded a third-round selection (70th) to Carolina in exchange for third and sixth-round selections (73rd and 191st)
The Eagles traded a sixth-round selection (225th) and a seventh-round selection (240th) to the Washington Football Team in exchange for a fifth-round selection in the 2022 NFL Draft

Staff

Final roster

Preseason

Regular season

Schedule
The Eagles' 2021 schedule was announced on May 12.

Note: Intra-division opponents are in bold text.

Game summaries

Week 1: at Atlanta Falcons

After an Atlanta field goal, the Eagles would take the lead after an 18 yard pass from Jalen Hurts to DeVonta Smith and never looked back. The week one rout over the Falcons was the Eagles biggest win, scoring over 30 points, and have a winning record (1-0) for the first time since 2019. This is also the Eagles first win in Atlanta since 2009.

Week 2: vs. San Francisco 49ers
The Eagles would start the game being able to march down the field throughout the first half, including a 91 yard bomb from Jalen Hurts to Quez Watkins. However, after a failed "Philly Special" attempt, and blocked field goal, the Birds could only muster 3 points in the first half. The 49ers would tack on 10 points in the 4th quarter before surrendering a late QB sneak TD from Hurts. The loss dropped the Eagles to 1-1 and their first loss to the 49ers since 2014.

Week 3: at Dallas Cowboys
The Eagles traveled down to Arlington, Texas to take on the Dallas Cowboys on Monday Night Football. The Cowboys would jump on the board quickly after an Ezekiel Elliott 1 yard TD. The Eagles defense made a play by stripping the ball from Dak Prescott in their own endzone resulting in a touchdown from Fletcher Cox. From that point on, the Dallas offense had its way on the Eagles defense and didn't get any help from a pass heavy Eagles offense that could not gain much momentum. The Eagles would get a couple of garbage time TDs from Jalen Hurts to Zach Ertz and Greg Ward. With the loss, the Eagles would fall to 1-2 and lose their 4th straight game at AT&T Stadium.

Week 4: vs. Kansas City Chiefs

Week 5: at Carolina Panthers
After a slow offensive start, the Eagles would rally a second half comeback with the help of a blocked punt and outscoring the Panthers 15-3 in the second half. With the win, the Eagles improved to 2-3.

Week 6: vs. Tampa Bay Buccaneers

Week 7: at Las Vegas Raiders

Week 8: at Detroit Lions
In a newly looking, run heavy offense, the Eagles would rush their way to a 44-6 blowout over the lowly Detroit Lions. The win marks the first time the Eagles win at Ford Field since 2010, as well as their first 40+ point game since Super Bowl LII. With the Win, the Eagles improve to 3-5.

Week 9: vs. Los Angeles Chargers

Week 10: at Denver Broncos
Going into Denver, the Eagles introduced their white jersey on black pants. With the win, the Eagles earn their first win in Denver since 1989 and matched their 2020 win total.

Week 11: vs. New Orleans Saints

The Eagles survived a late rally by the Saints to earn their first home win since Week 14 of the 2020 season, which coincidentally also came against New Orleans. Philadelphia improved to 5–6 on the season with the 40-29 win, improving on their win total from the previous season.

Week 12: at New York Giants

Hurts played poorly throughout the game, throwing 3 interceptions. On the Eagles' final two plays, Jalen Reagor dropped two passes at the goal line, securing their defeat.

With the loss, the Eagles 2-game winning streak was snapped as they fell to 5–7, and lost back-to-back games against the Giants for the first time since 2007-08.

Week 13: at New York Jets

Thanks to a stellar performance by backup quarterback Gardner Minshew, the Eagles improved to 12–0 in their all-time series against the New York Jets.

Week 15: vs. Washington Football Team

In the week leading up to the game, a COVID-19 outbreak among the Washington Football Team led to postponement of the game originally scheduled for December 19. The game was moved to Tuesday night. On the rare Tuesday Night Football, Washington got off to a quick start after a pair of Eagles turnovers starting from a flukey interception bouncing off of Dallas Goedert's foot to a Jalen Hurts' fumble. From the second quarter on, the Eagles would score 20 unanswered points before surrendering a Washington TD. A late back shoulder throw from Jalen Hurts to Greg Ward would secure the Eagles' victory. This is the first divisional win in the Hurts/Sirianni era and a win that keeps the Eagles alive in the playoff push.

Week 16: vs. New York Giants

Despite a slow start, the Eagles rallied with 31 second-half points in a 34-10 rout of the shorthanded New York Giants, including a touchdown catch by Lane Johnson and a pick-six by Alex Singleton. This win was Philadelphia's eighth straight home win and 90th overall win over their rivals.

Week 17: at Washington Football Team

Despite again playing less-than-stellar football to start the game, the Eagles rallied for their fourth straight win, improving to 9-7 on the year and earning their first winning season and playoff appearance since 2019, thanks to wins by the San Francisco 49ers and Green Bay Packers later that day. This was also Philadelphia's first sweep of Washington since that same season, and their fourth in their past five seasons.

Week 18: vs. Dallas Cowboys

With a playoff spot already clinched, the Eagles rested Jalen Hurts, who was nursing an ankle injury, and most other key starters in the season finale. The Cowboys, who played nearly all of their key starters, had an offensive attack that was too powerful for the Eagles' backups to handle. The 51–26 loss ended the Eagles' regular season with a 9–8 record, and the 51 points were the most the Eagles surrendered in a single game at Lincoln Financial Field, surpassing the previous mark of 48 against the New Orleans Saints in 2009.

Standings

Division

Conference

Postseason

Game summaries

NFC Wild Card Playoffs: at (2) Tampa Bay Buccaneers

In a rematch of their Week 6 meeting, the Eagles visited the Buccaneers. Tampa Bay would jump out to an early lead and never look back in a 31-15 rout of Philadelphia. With this loss, the Eagles finished their season with a total record of 9-9.

Statistics

Team

Individual

Statistics correct as of the end of the 2021 NFL season

References

External links
 

Philadelphia
Philadelphia Eagles seasons
Philadelphia Eagles